The 1980 United States presidential election in Michigan took place on November 4, 1980. All fifty states and The District of Columbia were part of the 1980 United States presidential election. Voters chose 21 electors to the Electoral College, who voted for president and vice president.

Michigan was won by former California Governor Ronald Reagan (R) by 6.5%. This result nonetheless made Michigan 3.2% more Democratic than the nation-at-large. This is despite the fact that it voted to the right of the nation by over seven points in 1976.

Results

Results by county

See also
 United States presidential elections in Michigan

References

Michigan
1980
1980 Michigan elections